Reva Foos (born 15 September 1993) is a German swimmer. She competed in the women's 4 × 200 metre freestyle relay event at the 2018 European Aquatics Championships, winning the bronze medal.

References

1993 births
Living people
German female swimmers
Place of birth missing (living people)
German female freestyle swimmers
European Aquatics Championships medalists in swimming
European Championships (multi-sport event) bronze medalists
20th-century German women
21st-century German women